Propoxur (Baygon) is a carbamate non-systemic insecticide, produced from catechol, and was introduced in 1959. It has a fast knockdown and long residual effect, and is used against turf, forestry, and household pests and fleas. It is also used in pest control for domestic animals, Anopheles mosquitoes, ants, gypsy moths, and other agricultural pests. It can also be used as a molluscicide.

Several U.S. states have petitioned the Environmental Protection Agency (EPA) to use propoxur against bedbug infestations, but the EPA has been reluctant to approve indoor use because of its potential toxicity to children after chronic exposure.

Action
Carbamate insecticides kill insects by irreversibly inactivating the enzyme acetylcholinesterase.

Environmental effects
Propoxur rapidly breaks down in alkaline solution.  Propoxur is highly toxic to many bird species, although its toxicity varies by the species, and it is highly toxic to honeybees. It is moderately to slightly toxic to fish and other aquatic species.

References

Acetylcholinesterase inhibitors
Carbamate insecticides
Catechol ethers
Isopropyl compounds
Aromatic carbamates
Phenol esters